Joe Licata (born November 16, 1992) is an American football coach and former quarterback. He played college football at Buffalo. He was signed by the Cincinnati Bengals as an undrafted free agent in 2016.

Early years
Licata attended Williamsville South High School in Williamsville, New York, where he played both football and basketball. As a basketball player, he set the New York State Public High School Athletic Association record for career three-point field goals made with 343. He set the school's career record for passing yards, and was named Buffalo News Player of the Year in 2010. Licata received scholarship offers to play college football for Syracuse, Akron and Buffalo in addition to interest from other schools. Licata committed to the University at Buffalo, saying it "was a dream to represent Buffalo" and play for his hometown team in front of his friends and family.
His little sister, Grace, plays Division III basketball at Buffalo State College.

College career
Licata was redshirted as a freshman in 2011. He entered the 2012 season as the backup quarterback to Alex Zordich, but earned the starting job midway through the season and led the team to a 3–1 record over the final four games of the season. In 2013, Licata and the Bulls had one of the finest team seasons in school history, as he led the team to an 8–5 record and an appearance in the 2013 Famous Idaho Potato Bowl, the second bowl appearance in school history. During the 2014 season, Licata posted one of the finest passing seasons in Buffalo school history, throwing for 2,647 passing yards, and a school single-season record 29 passing touchdowns. The 2015 season saw Licata finish his college career by passing Drew Willy to become Buffalo's career leader in both passing yards (9,485) and passing touchdowns (76).

NCAA career stats

Professional career
After going undrafted in the 2016 NFL Draft and receiving a pro tryout from the Buffalo Bills, on May 16, 2016 Licata was signed as an undrafted free agent by the Cincinnati Bengals. In the NFL preseason, he completed three of ten passes and threw two interceptions. Licata was released on August 29.

Coaching career
On July 14, 2017, Licata accepted a position at Bishop Timon – St. Jude High School in South Buffalo, Buffalo, New York as head coach and athletic director. Here, he had the worst winning percentage of any football coach in Timon history with a record of 7–30 in 4 seasons. He also helped developed junior varsity players for Jason Rowe's varsity basketball program. On May 28, 2021, Licata accepted a position to return to the University at Buffalo as an offensive analyst on the staff of new Bulls head coach Maurice Linguist. On March 9, 2022, Licata returned to Williamsville South High School as their football head coach.

Head coaching record

References

External links
Buffalo Bulls bio
Cincinnati Bengals bio

1992 births
Living people
American football quarterbacks
Buffalo Bulls football coaches
Buffalo Bulls football players
Cincinnati Bengals players
High school football coaches in New York (state)
Sportspeople from Buffalo, New York
Players of American football from Buffalo, New York